Savino is a rural locality (a village) in Gorodetskoye Rural Settlement, Kichmengsko-Gorodetsky District, Vologda Oblast, Russia. The population was 49 as of 2002.

Geography 
Savino is located 20 km southwest of Kichmengsky Gorodok (the district's administrative centre) by road. Shilovo is the nearest rural locality.

References 

Rural localities in Kichmengsko-Gorodetsky District